Palilula may refer to:
Palilula (Belgrade), a municipality in the city of Belgrade, Serbia

Palilula (Niš), a municipality in the city of Niš, Serbia
Palilula (neighbourhood, Niš)
Palilula (Svrljig), a village in the municipality of Svrljig, Serbia
Palilula (Bulgaria), a village in Boychinovtsi Municipality, Montana Province, Bulgaria
Palilula (Romania) (ro), a village in Bucovăţ Commune, Dolj County, Romania